Azerbaijan competed at the 2014 Summer Youth Olympics, in Nanjing, China from 16 August to 28 August 2014.

Medalists

Archery

Azerbaijan qualified a female archer from its performance at the 2013 World Archery Youth Championships. 

Individual

Team

Athletics

Azerbaijan qualified three athletes.

Qualification Legend: Q=Final A (medal); qB=Final B (non-medal); qC=Final C (non-medal); qD=Final D (non-medal); qE=Final E (non-medal)

Boys
Field Events

Girls
Track & road events

Field events

Boxing

Azerbaijan qualified three boxers based on its performance at the 2014 AIBA Youth World Championships

Boys

Judo

Azerbaijan qualified two athletes based on the results at the 2013 IJF Cadet World Championships.

Individual

Team

Rowing

Azerbaijan qualified one boat based on their performance at the 2013 Rowing Junior Championships.

Qualification Legend: FA=Final A (medal); FB=Final B (non-medal); FC=Final C (non-medal); FD=Final D (non-medal); SA/B=Semifinals A/B; SC/D=Semifinals C/D; R=Repechage

Shooting

Azerbaijan was given a wild card to compete.

Individual

Team

Swimming

Azerbaijan qualified one swimmer.

Girls

Taekwondo

Azerbaijan qualified four athletes based on its performance at the Taekwondo Qualification Tournament.

Boys

Girls

Wrestling

Azerbaijan qualified five athletes based on its performance at the 2014 European Cadet Championships.

Boys

Girls

References

2014 in Azerbaijani sport
Nations at the 2014 Summer Youth Olympics
Azerbaijan at the Youth Olympics